Lanephus njumanii is a species of beetle in the family Cerambycidae, the only species in the genus Lanephus.

References

Elaphidiini